Haiti—an island country 600 miles off the coast of the U.S. state of Florida—shares the Caribbean island of Hispaniola with the Dominican Republic. Haiti has received billions in foreign assistance, yet persists as one of the poorest countries and has the lowest human development index in the Americas. There have been more than 15 natural disasters since 2001 including tropical storms, flooding, earthquakes and hurricanes. The international donor community classifies Haiti as a fragile state. Haiti is also considered a post-conflict state—one emerging from a recent coup d'état and civil war.

United States aid to Haiti

Haiti's economic and social underdevelopment has been attributed to political instability and insufficient investment by the Haitian government towards natural and human resources. Between the fiscal years of 1995 and 1999, the U.S. contributed approximately US$884 million in financial assistance to Haiti. Haiti received US$13 billion in foreign aid from the international community from 2011 to 2021. Despite this, living conditions remain poor. According to page 35 of the Greening Aid book there are key questions that arise on where the money flows and why.

Among the initiatives United States funds have supported are:

Food assistance programs that include a school lunch program that feeds around 500,000 children daily
Agricultural development programs that have endeavored to revitalize Haiti's coffee sector and to help thousands of Haitian farmers adopt sustainable agricultural practices and protect the environment
Teacher training programs that have included 6,000 educators at the primary and secondary level
Population programs that have expanded modern family planning practices in many rural areas
Health care programs that have supported child immunization and have helped provide primary care to nearly half of the Haitian population
In 2021, the U.S. Government Accountability Office (GAO) reported on USAID funding for reconstruction and development activities since the 2010 earthquake.

Human resources
The U.S. provides human resources to Haiti. This includes tourism and humanitarian assistance. There is currently no Peace Corps program in Haiti. Peace Corps volunteers living in the neighboring Dominican Republic are prohibited from crossing the border.

Economic development

Haiti has experienced decades of extremely high unemployment and underemployment. The decline in urban assembly sector jobs, from a peak of 80,000 in 1986 to fewer than 17,000 in 1994, contributed to increased unemployment. To revitalize the economy, U.S. assistance has attempted to create opportunities for stable, sustainable employment for the growing population, particularly those who compose the country's vast informal economy. A post-intervention transitional program of short-term job creation, principally in small towns and rural areas, provided employment to as many as 50,000 workers per day throughout the country. More recently, programs that help to increase commercial bank lending to small- and medium-scale entrepreneurs, especially in the agricultural sector, have helped to create jobs and foster economic growth.

Additional U.S. efforts in economic revitalization include the establishment of the U.S.-Haiti Business Development Council, an Overseas Private Investment Corporation commercial loan program, and inclusion of Haiti within the Caribbean Basin Initiative. These efforts provide greater market opportunities for American and Haitian businesses. Current Congressional prohibitions on providing assistance to or through the Haitian government has accelerated the move to private voluntary agencies as contractors to oversee the use of U.S. aid funds.

Throughout the 2001–2004 time period the United States Chamber of Commerce backed a government aid embargo upon Haiti's elected Aristide government. This led to economic decline. Haiti's government budget was approximately 30-40 percent dependent on the cut-off aid.

Obama-era to Trump-era transition on Haiti 
During Barack Obama's eight-year presidential service, his administration pledged United States’ assistance in Haitian foreign relief programs assisting global health, economic security, and food-related aid. Some of the goals of the U.S. Global Health Initiatives (GHI) include: HIV/AIDS prevention of 12 million individuals, reduction of Malaria for 225 million, and reduced mortality rates of 35% across all assisted nations. President Obama pledged $3.5 billion in a global hunger and food security investment from 2010 to 2012. The implementation of GHI and the Global Food Security Initiative (Feed the Future) contributed to an increase in total aid provided during the period of 2012 to 2015. The early years resulted in an increase and over usage of appropriated funding. Due to budgetary pressures, an overall lack of congressional support and interest, plus Haiti's own technical, environmental and economic reasons, many foreign aid programs have been cancelled and shelved, such as construction of a new port in northern Haiti, construction of the Caracol Industrial Park and expand port in nearby Cap-Haïtien. Although the assistance in Haitian foreign aid failed, it successfully revealed the importance of food security and agricultural development in Haiti.

A few days after President Trump's inauguration in January 2017, the State Department conducted a formal review of the United States' economic support fund. The review was specifically centered around the Obama Administration's flurry of foreign aid contributions and initiatives made during the final two months of his term. In his first State of the Union address, President Trump iterated a theme of "America First," proclaiming his dislike of programs like democracy promotion and generic humanitarian aid aimed largely at countries in Latin America. President Trump insists that Congress pass laws to ensure that "American foreign-assistance dollars always serve American interests, and only go to "America’s friends." However, only about one percent of the United States federal budget goes to foreign aid — 40% considered security assistance, rather than economic or humanitarian aid.

Canadian aid to Haiti

Canada–Haiti relations are relations between Canada and Haiti. Canada is Haiti's second largest donor after the United States. During the unsettled period from 1957 to 1990, Canada received many Haitian refugees, who now form a significant minority in Quebec. Canada participated in various international interventions in Haiti between 1994 and 2004, and continues to provide substantial aid to Haiti.

UN aid to Haiti
The UN is the largest foreign source of relief aid to Haiti from the 2010 Haiti earthquake, although in December 2011, the Haitian President Michel Martelly said that "The cooperation with Venezuela is the most important in Haiti right now in terms of impact, direct impact."
USA, through USAID is giving more than $712 million in aid. However, this amount also comprises donations of many non-governmental organizations such as World Vision and the Red Cross accumulated from different parts of the globe through various
campaigns in support of Haiti. In comparison, the EU and the 27 member-states alone are providing over 400 million euro, which is about $650 million.

Following the 2010 Haiti earthquake Venezuela made substantial contributions to the humanitarian response to the earthquake, pledging $1.3bn in aid in addition to cancelling $395m in PetroCaribe debt. Projects included the construction of three power plants, which provided a fifth of Haiti's electricity in December 2011.

A country by country Excel report can be seen here, where the EU countries are presented separately, and the US contribution is diminished to about 460 million dollars. (*Represents aid tied to 2010 earthquake relief)

Notes
1. Amount unknown
The notes below are conflicting numbers from certain countries and as such may not be accurate are not included in the above table.
2.Conflicting information from the source, original data states 722,900 or 486,000 
3.290,000 11,161,000 
4.134,904 50,110,000
The economic growth in the world allows the support given to Haiti to be immense: much over 2 billion dollars is generously pooled in from different countries in the world

Due to the growing percent of people living in poverty, it would be necessary to create new infrastructures

Cuban aid to Haiti

Cuban medics have been in Haiti dating back to 1998. In addition, about 1000 Haitian doctors were trained for free by Cuba since that year. Besides from the doctors already in Haiti, an additional medical brigade of 1200 sent by Cuba were among the first responder to the 2010 Haiti earthquake. Under the financial aids from Venezuela, 22 care posts were organized and operated by Cuban health workers. The Cuban medical team also works closely with the assistance of 100 specialists from different countries including Venezuela.

2020 marks the 22th anniversary of Cuban medical aids to Haiti, during this period which Cuban doctors witness and assist the people Haiti through the Hurricane Georges, the 2010 Haiti earthquake, the 2010s Haiti cholera outbreak and now the 2021 Haiti earthquake. A medical team with 253 specialists from Cuba was the first responder for the mission of assisting and cooperate with the Haitian authorities to provide health care services.

Venezuelan aid to Haiti

Haiti has benefited from a solid economic partnership with Venezuela. This recently forged friendship between Venezuelan president Hugo Chávez and Haitian president René Préval has resulted in various economic agreements. After a visit by Chavez in March 2007, Venezuela and Cuba announced a $1 Billion fund to develop energy, health, and infrastructure in Haiti. As part of this deal, 4 power plants were constructed in Port-au-Prince, Cap-Haïtien, and Gonaïves, increasing the country's power production by 160 MW in 2007.

Venezuela's assistance to Haiti is founded upon a historic act where the newly independent Haiti welcomed and tended to first Francisco de Miranda, then to Simón Bolívar and provided both with military assistance in the liberation of much of South America.

References

Economy of Haiti
Foreign relations of Haiti
Haiti